The following is a list that contains general information about GPUs and video cards by AMD, including those by ATI Technologies before 2006, based on official specifications in table-form.

Field explanations 
The headers in the table listed below describe the following:
 Model – The marketing name for the GPU assigned by AMD/ATI. Note that ATI trademarks have been replaced by AMD trademarks starting with the Radeon HD 6000 series for desktop and AMD FirePro series for professional graphics.
 Codename – The internal engineering codename for the GPU.
 Launch – Date of release for the GPU.
 Architecture – The microarchitecture used by the GPU.
 Fab – Fabrication process. Average feature size of components of the GPU.
 Transistors – Number of transistors on the die.
 Die size – Physical surface area of the die.
 Core config – The layout of the graphics pipeline, in terms of functional units.
 Core clock – The reference base and boost (if available) core clock frequency.
 Fillrate
 Pixel - The rate at which pixels can be rendered by the raster operators to a display. Measured in pixels/s.
 Texture - The rate at which textures can be mapped by the texture mapping units onto a polygon mesh. Measured in texels/s.
 Performance
 Shader operations - How many operations the pixel shaders (or unified shaders in Direct3D 10 and newer GPUs) can perform. Measured in operations/s.
 Vertex operations - The amount of geometry operations that can be processed on the vertex shaders in one second (only applies to Direct3D 9.0c and older GPUs). Measured in vertices/s.
 Memory
 Bus type – Type of memory bus utilized.
 Bus width – Maximum bit width of the memory bus utilized.
 Size – Size of the graphics memory.
 Clock – The reference memory clock frequency.
 Bandwidth – Maximum theoretical memory bandwidth based on bus type and width.
 TDP (Thermal design power) – Maximum amount of heat generated by the GPU chip, measured in Watt.
 TBP (Typical board power) – Typical power drawn by the total board, including power for the GPU chip and peripheral equipment, such as Voltage regulator module, memory, fans, etc., measured in Watt. 
 Bus interface – Bus by which the graphics processor is attached to the system (typically an expansion slot, such as PCI, AGP, or PCIe).
 API support – Rendering and computing APIs supported by the GPU and driver.

Due to conventions changing over time, some numerical definitions such as core config, core clock, performance and memory should not be compared one-to-one across generations. The following tables are for reference use only, and do not reflect actual performance.

Video codec acceleration 
 R100 – Video Immersion
 R200 – Video Immersion II
 R300 – Video Immersion II + Video Shader
 R410 – Video Shader HD
 R420 – Video Shader HD + DXVA
 R520 – Avivo Video
 R600 – Avivo HD – UVD 1.0
 R700 – UVD 2, UVD 2.2
 Evergreen – UVD 2.2
 Northern Islands – UVD 3 (HD 67xx UVD 2.2)
 Southern Islands – UVD 3.1, VCE 1.0
 Sea Islands – UVD 4.2, VCE 2.0
 Volcanic Islands – UVD 5.0, 6.0, VCE 3.0
 Arctic Islands – UVD 6.3, VCE 3.4
 Vega – UVD 7.0, VCE 4.0 and VCN 1.0 only at AMD Raven Ridge
 Navi 1X – VCN 2.0
 Navi 2X – VCN 3.0

Features overview

API overview

Desktop GPUs

Wonder series

Mach series

Rage series 

1 Pixel pipelines : Vertex shaders : Texture mapping units : Render output units
2 OpenGL 1.0 (Generic 2D) is provided through software implementations.

Radeon 7000 series 

 All models include Direct3D 7.0 and OpenGL 1.3
 The R100 cards were originally launched without any numbering as Radeon SDR, DDR, LE and VE; these products were later "rebranded" to their names within the numbered naming scheme, when the Radeon 8000 series was introduced.

1 Pixel pipelines : Vertex shaders : Texture mapping units : Render output units
A First number indicates cards with 32MB of memory. Second number indicates cards with 64MB of memory.
B First number indicates OEM cards. Second number indicates Retail cards.

IGP (3xx series) 
 All models are manufactured with a 180 nm fabrication process
 All models include Direct3D 7.0 and OpenGL 1.3
 Based on the Radeon VE

1 Pixel pipelines : Vertex shaders : Texture mapping units : Render output units

Radeon 8000 and 9000 series 

 All models are manufactured with a 150 nm fabrication process
 All models include Direct3D 8.1 and OpenGL 1.4

1 Pixel shaders : Vertex shaders : Texture mapping units : Render output units

IGP (9000 series) 
 All models are manufactured with a 150 nm fabrication process
 All models include Direct3D 8.1 and OpenGL 1.4
 Based on the Radeon 9200

1 Pixel shaders : Vertex shaders : Texture mapping units : Render output units

Radeon R300 series

AGP (9000 series, X1000 series) 

 All models include Direct3D 9.0 and OpenGL 2.0
 All models use an AGP 8x interface

1 Pixel shaders : Vertex Shaders : Texture mapping units : Render output units
2 The 256-bit version of the 9800 SE when unlocked to 8-pixel pipelines with third party driver modifications should function close to a full 9800 Pro.

PCI-E (X3xx, X5xx, X6xx, X1000 series) 

 All models include Direct3D 9.0 and OpenGL 2.0
 All models use a PCI-E ×16 interface

1 Pixel shaders : Vertex Shaders : Texture mapping units : Render output units

IGP (X2xx, 11xx series) 

 All models include Direct3D 9.0 and OpenGL 2.0
 Based on the Radeon X300

1Pixel shaders : Vertex Shaders : Texture mapping units : Render output units

Radeon X700 and X800 series

AGP (X7xx, X8xx) 

 All models include AGP 8×
 All models include Direct3D 9.0b and OpenGL 2.0

1 Pixel shaders : Vertex shaders : Texture mapping units : Render output units

PCI-E (X5xx, X7xx, X8xx, X1000 series) 

 All models include PCI-E ×16
 All models include Direct3D 9.0b and OpenGL 2.0

1 Pixel shaders : Vertex Shaders : Texture mapping units : Render output units

IGP (X12xx, 21xx) 

 All models include Direct3D 9.0b and OpenGL 2.0
 Based on Radeon X700

Radeon X1000 series 

Note that ATI X1000 series cards (e.g. X1900) do not have Vertex Texture Fetch, hence they do not fully comply with the VS 3.0 model. Instead, they offer a feature called "Render to Vertex Buffer (R2VB)" that provides functionality that is an alternative Vertex Texture Fetch.

1 Pixel shaders : Vertex shaders : Texture mapping units : Render output units

Radeon HD 2000 series

Radeon HD 3000 series

IGP (HD 3000) 

 All Radeon HD 3000 IGP models include Direct3D 10.0 and OpenGL 3.3

1 Unified shaders : Texture mapping units : Render output units
2 The clock frequencies may vary in different usage scenarios, as AMD PowerPlay technology is implemented. The clock frequencies listed here refer to the officially announced clock specifications.
3 The sideport is a dedicated memory bus. It is preferably used for a frame buffer.

All-in-Wonder series 

1 Pixel shaders : Vertex shaders : Texture mapping units : Render output units
2 Unified shaders : Texture mapping units : Render output units

Radeon HD 4000 series 

1 Unified shaders : Texture mapping units : Render output units
2 The effective data transfer rate of GDDR5 is quadruple its nominal clock, instead of double as it is with other DDR memory.
3 The TDP is reference design TDP values from AMD. Different non-reference board designs from vendors may lead to slight variations in actual TDP.
4 All models feature UVD2 and PowerPlay.

IGP (HD 4000) 

 All Radeon HD 4000 IGP models include Direct3D 10.1 and OpenGL 2.0

1 Unified shaders : Texture mapping units : Render output units
2 The clock frequencies may vary in different usage scenarios, as ATI PowerPlay technology is implemented. The clock frequencies listed here refer to the officially announced clock specifications.
3 The sideport is a dedicated memory bus. It preferably used for frame buffer.

Radeon HD 5000 series 

 The HD5000 series is the last series of AMD GPUs which supports two analog CRT-monitors with a single graphics card (i.e. with two RAM-DACs).
 AMD Eyefinity introduced.

Radeon HD 6000 series 
• The Radeon HD 6000 series has a new tesselation engine which is said to double the performance when working with tesselation compared to the previous HD 5000 series.

IGP (HD 6000)
 All models feature the UNB/MC Bus interface
 All models do not feature double-precision FP
 With driver Update OpenGL 4.4 available (Last Catalyst 15.12). OpenGL 4.5 available with Crimson Beta (driver version 15.30 or higher).
 All models feature Angle independent anisotropic filtering, UVD3, and AMD Eyefinity capabilities, with up to three outputs.
 All models feature 3D Blu-ray Disc acceleration.
Embedded GPU's as part of AMD's Lynx platform APU's.

Radeon HD 7000 series

IGP (HD 7000) 
 All models feature the UNB/MC Bus interface
 All models do not support double-precision FP
 TeraScale 2 (VLIW5) based APUs feature angle independent anisotropic filtering, UVD3, and Eyefinity capabilities, with up to three outputs.
 TeraScale 3 (VLIW4) based APUs feature angle independent anisotropic filtering, UVD3.2, and Eyefinity capabilities, with up to four outputs.

Radeon HD 8000 series

Radeon 200 series

Radeon 300 series

Radeon 400 series

Radeon 500 series

Radeon RX Vega series

Radeon VII series

Radeon RX 5000 series

Radeon RX 6000 series

Radeon RX 7000 series

Mobile GPUs 
These GPUs are either integrated into the mainboard or occupy a Mobile PCI Express Module (MXM).

Rage Mobility series 

1 Vertex shaders : Pixel shaders : Texture mapping units : Render output units.

Mobility Radeon series 

1 Vertex shaders : Pixel shaders : Texture mapping units : Render output units.

Mobility Radeon X300, X600, X700, X800 series 

1 Vertex shaders : Pixel shaders : Texture mapping units : Render output units.

Mobility Radeon X1000 series 

1 Vertex shaders : Pixel shaders : Texture mapping units : Render output units.

Mobility Radeon HD 2000 series 

OpenGL 3.3 is possible with latest drivers for all RV6xx.

1 Vertex shaders : Pixel shaders : Texture mapping units : Render output units.
2 Unified Shaderss : Texture mapping units : Render output units

Mobility Radeon HD 3000 series 

1 Unified Shaders : Texture mapping units : Render output units

Mobility Radeon HD 4000 series 

1 Unified shaders : Texture mapping units : Render output units
2 The effective data transfer rate of GDDR5 is quadruple its nominal clock, instead of double as it is with other DDR memory.

Mobility Radeon HD 5000 series 

1 Unified shaders : Texture mapping units : Render output units
2 The effective data transfer rate of GDDR5 is quadruple its nominal clock, instead of double as it is with other DDR memory.

Radeon HD 6000M series

IGP (HD 6000) 
 All models feature the UNB/MC Bus interface
 All models do mnot feature double-precision FP
 All models feature Angle independent anisotropic filtering, UVD3, and Eyefinity capabilities, with up to three outputs.

IGP (HD 6000G) 
 All models include Direct3D 11, OpenGL 4.4 and OpenCL 1.2
 All models feature the UNB/MC Bus interface
 All models do not feature double-precision FP
 All models feature angle independent anisotropic filtering, UVD3 and Eyefinity capabilities, with up to three outputs.
 All models feature VLIW5

1 Unified shaders : Texture mapping units : Render output units : Compute units
2 TDP specified for AMD reference designs, includes CPU power consumption. Actual TDP of retail products may vary.

Radeon HD 7000M series

IGP (HD 7000G)

Radeon HD 8000M series

Radeon M200 series

Radeon M300 series

Radeon M400 series

Radeon 500 series

Radeon 600 series

Radeon RX 5000M series

Radeon RX 6000M series

Radeon RX 7000M series

Workstation GPUs

FireGL series 

1 Vertex shaders : Pixel shaders : Texture mapping units : Render output units
2 Unified shaders : Texture mapping units : Render output units : Compute Units

FireMV (Multi-View) series 

1 Vertex shaders : Pixel shaders : Texture mapping unit : Render output units
2 Unified shaders : Texture mapping unit : Render output units

FirePro (Multi-View) series

FirePro 3D series (V000) 

1 Unified shaders : Texture mapping units : Render output units : Compute Units
2 The effective data transfer rate of GDDR5 is quadruple its nominal clock, instead of double as it is with other DDR memory
3  Windows 7, 8.1, 10 Support for Fire Pro Cards with Terascale 2 and later by firepro driver 15.301.2601

FirePro series (Vx900) 

1 Unified shaders : Texture mapping units : Render output units : Compute Units
2 The effective data transfer rate of GDDR5 is quadruple its nominal clock, instead of double as it is with other DDR memory.
3 Support for Windows 7, 8.1 for OpenGL 4.4 and OpenCL 2.0, when Hardware is prepared with firepro driver 14.502.1045

FirePro Workstation series (Wx000) 
 Vulkan 1.0 and OpenGL 4.5 possible for GCN with Driver Update FirePro equal to Radeon Crimson 16.3 or higher.
 Vulkan 1.1 possible for GCN with Radeon Pro Software 18.Q1.1 or higher. It might not fully apply to GCN 1.0 or 1.1 GPUs.

1 Unified shaders : Texture mapping units : Render output units : Compute Units
2 The effective data transfer rate of GDDR5 is quadruple its nominal clock, instead of double as it is with other DDR memory.
3 OpenGL 4.4: support with AMD FirePro driver release 14.301.000 or later, in footnotes of specs

FirePro D-Series 

In 2014, AMD released the D-Series specifically for Mac Pro workstations.

1 Unified shaders : Texture mapping units : Render output units : compute units

FirePro Workstation series (Wx100) 
 Vulkan 1.0 and OpenGL 4.5 possible for GCN with Driver Update FirePro equal to Radeon Crimson 16.3 or higher. OpenCL 2.1 and 2.2 possible for all OpenCL 2.0-Cards with Driver Update in Future (Khronos). Linux Support for OpenCL is limited with AMDGPU Driver 16.60 actual to Version 1.2.
 Vulkan 1.1 possible for GCN with Radeon Pro Software 18.Q1.1 or higher. It might not fully apply to GCN 1.0 or 1.1 GPUs.

1 Unified shaders : Texture mapping units : Render output units : compute units
2 The effective data transfer rate of GDDR5 is quadruple its nominal clock, instead of double as it is with other DDR memory.
3 OpenGL 4.4: support with AMD FirePro driver release 14.301.000 or later, in footnotes of specs

FirePro Workstation series (Wx300) 
 Vulkan 1.1 possible for GCN with Radeon Pro Software 18.Q1.1 or higher. It might not fully apply to GCN 1.0 or 1.1 GPUs.

Radeon PRO series

Radeon Pro WX x100 series 

 Vulkan 1.1 possible for GCN with Radeon Pro software 18.Q1.1 or higher.

Radeon Pro WX x200 series

Radeon Pro Vega series

Radeon Pro 5000 series

Radeon Pro W5000 series

Radeon Pro W6000 series

Mobile workstation GPUs

Mobility FireGL series

FirePro Mobile series

Radeon Pro WX x100 Mobile series 

 Half precision power (FP16) is equal to single precision power (FP32) in 4th GCN generation (in 5th Gen: half precision (FP16) = 2× SP (FP32))

Radeon Pro 400 series

Radeon Pro 500 series

Radeon Pro WX x200 Mobile series

Radeon Pro Vega series

Radeon Pro 5000M series

Radeon Pro W5000M series

Radeon Pro W6000M series

Server GPUs

FireStream series

FirePro Remote series 

1 Unified shaders : Texture mapping units : Render output units : compute units
2 The effective data transfer rate of GDDR5 is quadruple its nominal clock, instead of double as it is with other DDR memory.

FirePro Server series (S000x/Sxx 000) 
 Vulkan 1.0 and OpenGL 4.5 possible for GCN with Driver Update FirePro equal to Radeon Crimson 16.3 or higher. OpenGL 4.5 was only in Windows available. Actual Linux Driver support OpenGL 4.5 and Vulkan 1.0, but only OpenCL 1.2 by AMDGPU Driver 16.60.
 Vulkan 1.1 possible for GCN with Radeon Pro Software 18.Q1.1 or higher. It might not fully apply to GCN 1.0 or 1.1 GPUs.

1 Unified shaders : Texture mapping units : Render output units: Compute units
2 The effective data transfer rate of GDDR5 is quadruple its nominal clock, instead of double as it is with other DDR memory.
3 OpenGL 4.4: support with AMD FirePro driver release 14.301.000 or later, in footnotes of specs

Radeon Sky series 

1 Unified shaders : Texture mapping units : Render output units : compute units
2 The effective data transfer rate of GDDR5 is quadruple its nominal clock, instead of double as it is with other DDR memory.

Radeon Pro V series

Radeon Instinct series

Embedded GPUs 

1 Unified shaders : Texture mapping units : Render output units
2 CU = Compute units
3 The effective data transfer rate of GDDR5 is quadruple its nominal clock, instead of double as it is with other DDR memory.

Console GPUs 

1 Pixel shaders : Vertex shaders : Texture mapping units : Render output units

2 Unified shaders : Texture mapping units : Render output units 
4 Unified shaders : Texture mapping units : Render output units : RT Cores

3 12.8 GB/s texture bandwidth. 9.6 GB/s framebuffer and Z-buffer bandwidth.

 The Latte looks similar to the RV730 used in the Radeon HD4650/4670. However, it is an even closer, possibly exact specification match to the HD5550 as it has exactly the same clock, number of shaders, texture mapping units, and render outputs.

See also 

 List of Nvidia graphics processing units
 List of Intel graphics processing units
 List of AMD processors with 3D graphics
 Apple M1
 Radeon RX Vega M
Video Coding Engine, AMD's equivalent SIP core till 2017
Video Core Next, AMD's video core which combines the functionality of Video Coding Engine and Unified Video Decoder

References

External links
 TechPowerUp! GPU Database

ATI Technologies
ATI graphics processing units
Lists of microprocessors
ATI